Megachile tsimbazazae is a species of bee in the family Megachilidae. It was described by Pauly in 2001.

References

Tsimbazazae
Insects described in 2001